Germanies may refer to:
 Germany while it was divided into multiple states; notable possibilities include:
 West Germany (FRG) and East Germany (GDR), the division of Germany from 1949–1990.
 Allied Occupation Zones in Germany, the division of Germany after World War II from 1945–1949.
 Kleindeutschland and Großdeutschland ("Little Germany" and "Big Germany"), two competing ideas for unifying German-speaking lands in the 19th century.
 German Confederation, the loose organization of independent German-speaking states after the Napoleonic wars from 1815–1866.
 List of states in the Holy Roman Empire, the many Germanic states of the Holy Roman Empire from 1200–1800.
 Germania (guild) (plural: Germanies, "Brotherhoods"), artisan guilds in the Kingdom of Valencia.
 Revolt of the Brotherhoods, a revolt in Valencia from 1519–1523.